IAPF may refer to:
 Inter-American Peace Force established during the Dominican Civil War
 International Anti-Poaching Foundation - IAPF